Imogen Daisy Grant (born 26 February 1996) is a British lightweight world champion rower.

She won a bronze medal at the 2018 World Rowing Championships in Plovdiv, Bulgaria, in the lightweight single sculls and the following year she won another bronze medal at the 2019 World Rowing Championships in Ottensheim, Austria but this time as part of the lightweight double sculls with Emily Craig.

In 2021, she won a European silver medal in the lightweight double sculls in Varese, Italy.

With the Cambridge squad, she won the 2022 Oxford Cambridge University boat race.

At the 2022 World Cup III regatta in Lucerne, Switzerland, she won gold and set a new world's best time in women's lightweight singles of 7:23.36.

She won a gold medal in the Lightweight Double Sculls at the 2022 European Rowing Championships and the 2022 World Rowing Championships.

References

External links

1996 births
Living people
British female rowers
World Rowing Championships medalists for Great Britain
Rowers at the 2020 Summer Olympics
21st-century British women
20th-century British women